Leif Skagnæs (November 20, 1903 – July 1, 1955) was a Norwegian nordic combined skier who competed in early 1930s. He won an individual silver at the 1930 FIS Nordic World Ski Championships in Oslo.

He participated in the demonstration event, military patrol (precursor to biathlon), in the 1928 Winter Olympics.

External links

Norwegian male Nordic combined skiers
Norwegian military patrol (sport) runners
Olympic biathletes of Norway
Military patrol competitors at the 1928 Winter Olympics
1903 births
FIS Nordic World Ski Championships medalists in Nordic combined
1955 deaths